Dontarrious Dewayne Thomas (born September 2, 1980) is a former American football linebacker who last played for the Sacramento Mountain Lions of the United Football League. He was drafted by the Minnesota Vikings in the second round of the 2004 NFL Draft. He played college football at Auburn.

Thomas was also a member of the San Francisco 49ers, California Redwoods, and San Diego Chargers.

Early years
At Perry High School in Perry, Georgia, Thomas was a three sport standout in football, basketball, and track. In football, he was a Class 2-A-All-State selection, and as a senior, had 6 interceptions, returned an interception for a touchdown, had 78 tackles (50 solo tackles, 28 assisted), and rushed for 278 yards on only 14 carries (19.9 yd. per rush avg.).

Professional career

First stint with Vikings
Thomas was drafted by the Minnesota Vikings in the second round (48th overall) of the 2004 NFL Draft. He played four seasons with the Vikings, appearing in 59 games (10 starts) and recording 143 tackles, 1.5 sacks, and a forced fumble.

San Francisco 49ers
Thomas was originally signed No. 51 upon signing with the 49ers in 2008. When linebacker Brandon Moore was released in August, Thomas switched to Moore's #56 while the newly signed Takeo Spikes took 51.

However, on August 31, 2008, Thomas was released by the 49ers to make room for linebacker Ahmad Brooks.

Second stint with Vikings
Thomas was signed by the Minnesota Vikings on October 13, 2008 when offensive tackle Drew Radovich was placed on injured reserve. Thomas appeared in four games for the Vikings that season, recording one assisted tackle.

California Redwoods
Thomas signed with the California Redwoods of the United Football League in 2009 and recorded 35 tackles.

San Diego Chargers
Thomas was signed by the San Diego Chargers on January 5, 2010 after linebacker James Holt was placed on injured reserve.

NFL statistics

Key
 GP: games played
 COMB: combined tackles
 TOTAL: total tackles
 AST: assisted tackles
 SACK: sacks
 FF: forced fumbles
 FR: fumble recoveries
 FR YDS: fumble return yards 
 INT: interceptions
 IR YDS: interception return yards
 AVG IR: average interception return
 LNG: longest interception return
 TD: interceptions returned for touchdown
 PD: passes defensed

References

1980 births
Living people
People from Perry, Georgia
Players of American football from Georgia (U.S. state)
American football linebackers
Auburn Tigers football players
Minnesota Vikings players
San Francisco 49ers players
Sacramento Mountain Lions players
San Diego Chargers players